Parbat Ke Us Paar is a 1988 Indian Hindi language romance film directed by Raman Kumar. The film's music was composed by Khayyam.

Cast

Soundtrack

References

External links 

1988 films
1980s Hindi-language films
1980s romance films
Films scored by Khayyam
Indian romance films
Hindi-language romance films